These are lists of monarchs in Spain.

Monarchs of the current state 
List of Spanish monarchs

Monarchs of former states 
Kings of Alpuente, see Alpuente
List of Aragonese monarchs
List of viceroys of Aragon (alias lieutenants)
List of Asturian monarchs
List of emirs of Badajoz
List of Counts of Barcelona
List of Castilian monarchs
List of caliphs of Córdoba
List of Galician monarchs
List of Nasrid sultans of Granada
List of Leonese monarchs
List of monarchs of Majorca
Ra'îs of Manûrqa
List of Navarrese monarchs
List of Valencian monarchs
List of Umayyad caliphs

Nobility 
Dukes of Medina-Sidonia
Viscounts of Barcelona
Counts of Besalú
Counts of Cerdanya
Counts of Empúries
Counts of Roussillon
Counts of Urgell

See also 
 List of heads of state of Spain